Guangdong Holdings Limited is a Chinese holding company. Guangdong Holdings is the parent company of Hong Kong incorporated GDH Limited, in turn it was the parent company of listed companies Guangdong Investment, Guangnan Holdings, Guangdong Tannery and Guangdong Land Holdings. In additional Huajin Technology was traded in Chinese OTC market. Guangdong Holdings itself was owned by Guangdong Provincial People's Government.

History

Guangdong Enterprises
The predecessor of Guangdong Holdings, was a company incorporated on 3 June 1980 as Guangdong Enterprises Limited, a company incorporated in Hong Kong, as a "window company" of the mainland China (more precisely, the Guangdong Province) to trade with the outside world. In 1985 Guangdong Enterprises was renamed to Guangdong Enterprises (Holdings) Limited. In 1988 Guangdong Enterprises acquired a listed company as a special purpose vehicle that Guangdong Enterprises backdoor listing its assets.

Guangdong Holdings
The group suffered as a result of the 1997 Asian financial crisis; in 1999 a debt restructuring plan was agreed. The group received more assets from Guangdong Government as capital injection, most notably , an infrastructure that supply water from the upper stream of Dong River to Hong Kong via Shenzhen. More specifically, listed subsidiary Guangdong Investment acquired 81% stake of Cayman Islands incorporated "GH Water Supply (Holdings) Limited" in December 1999, the parent company of Dongshen Water Supply Project from Guangdong Government in an all-share deal (increased from 38.90% at 31 December 1999 to 55.49% at 31 December 2000), plus the government paid Guangdong Investment US$20 million. The agreed maximum volume of water that Hong Kong would buy in 1999 was 770 million cubic metre (actual supplied 738 million m3) In 1999 the agreed price was HK$3.085/m3.

On 10 December 1999 a new holding company for the group's overseas subsidiaries was incorporated in Hong Kong as GDH Limited. The Chinese name of GDH Limited was renamed on 8 July 2006.

The ultimate holding company, Guangdong Yue Gang Investment Holdings  was incorporated in the mainland China on 31 January 2000. The company was later renamed to Guangdong Holdings Limited . In 2015 the Chinese name of the company was added the word "group", making Guangdong Holdings Limited had almost the same Chinese name with GDH Limited.

Subsidiaries
 GDH Limited (100%)
 Guangdong Assets Management (100%)
 Guangdong Trust (100%)
 Guangdong Alliance Limited
 Guangdong Investment (54.68%)

See also
 Guangdong Hengjian Investment Holding
 Guangdong Provincial Railway Construction Investment Group 
 Guangdong Rising Asset Management

References

External links
 

Companies owned by the provincial government of China
Conglomerate companies of China
Companies based in Guangzhou
Chinese companies established in 1980